The 30th Song is the debut studio album by American hip hop DJ and record producer Mr. Dibbs. It was released on Rhymesayers Entertainment on February 28, 2003. "Outreach 5" was released as a single from the album on November 19, 2002. The album was ranked at number 27 on CMJ's Hip-Hop 2003 chart.

Critical reception

John Bush of AllMusic gave the album 4 stars out of 5, describing it as "a mostly instrumental journey through moods and grooves with (slightly) less emphasis on the sprawling grandeur of one of the Midwest's best turntablists." He added: "Poised halfway between the grandiose sonic austerity of DJ Shadow and the turntable madness of most turntablists, Mr. Dibbs shows how it's able to age gracefully in hip-hop." Michaelangelo Matos of Chicago Reader wrote: "As a piece, The 30th Song makes a case for Dibbs as the most interesting turntablist currently working." Meanwhile, Thomas Quinlan of Exclaim! stated: "Like most Dibbs releases, The 30th Song is heavy on drums, with plenty of psychedelic layers and cuts added, but sadly it still doesn't live up to his best effort, resting somewhere between the skate soundtrack Primitive Tracks and his Turntable Scientifics masterpiece."

Track listing

Personnel
Credits adapted from liner notes.

 Mr. Dibbs – turntables, production (2–14), executive production
 Fat Jon – production (1)
 Jel – co-production (6)
 Boo Boo McAfee – live performance (8)
 Tommy Davison – live performance (8)
 Slug – vocals (11), executive production
 DJ T-Rock – turntables (14), co-production (14)
 Brent Sayers – executive production
 Jason Cook – project coordination
 Devious – artwork
 Fat Nick – photography

References

External links
 

2003 debut albums
Rhymesayers Entertainment albums
Hip hop albums by American artists